Deasonia is a genus of green algae, in the family Actinochloridaceae.

References

External links

Chlamydomonadales genera
Chlamydomonadales